Laurence Impey (7 January 1923 – 19 July 1988) was a South African cricketer. He played in twelve first-class matches between 1946/47 and 1955/56.

See also
 List of Eastern Province representative cricketers

References

External links
 

1923 births
1988 deaths
South African cricketers
Eastern Province cricketers
Western Province cricketers
Cricketers from Cape Town